George "Mule" Suttles (March 31, 1901 – July 9, 1966) was an American first baseman and outfielder in Negro league baseball, most prominently with the Birmingham Black Barons, St. Louis Stars and Newark Eagles. Best known for his power hitting, Suttles was elected to the Baseball Hall of Fame in 2006.

Negro league career 

Born in Edgewater, Alabama, Suttles played one game for the Atlantic City Bacharach Giants in 1921, and broke into the Negro National League in 1923 with the Birmingham Black Barons. Suttles was renowned for hitting for power as well as batting average. In five years with the Stars (1926–1930), he led the league in home runs twice and in doubles, triples, and batting average once each. His 1926 season was the fifth time in league history that a player won the batting Triple Crown.

Suttles' final seasons were spent playing first base for the Newark Eagles' "Million Dollar Infield" with Dick Seay at second, Willie Wells at shortstop, and Ray Dandridge at third. He also managed, and was highly respected. He is one of nine players to have won multiple league batting titles.

East–West games 

In five East–West All-Star Games, he batted .412 with an .883 slugging percentage. He also hit the first ever home run in the history of the east–west game.

Career totals 

In 26 documented exhibition games against white competition, Suttles hit .374 with five home runs. He hit .329 with 179 home runs in Negro League competition, the latter number second on the all-time list in Negro League play, behind only Turkey Stearnes.

Legacy 
Willie Wells saw the homer and remarked, "He hit this damn ball so far it looked like we were playing in a lot; it didn't look like no ball park." It was because of Suttles' strength that he got his nickname, and late in games when a big hit was needed his teammates would encourage him with cries of, "Kick, Mule!" Clarence Israel, an Eagles player, was quoted as saying, "He was considered my dad. Suttles was the most gentle person I ever saw."

In 2001, writer Bill James ranked Suttles as the 43rd-greatest baseball player of all-time and the second-best left fielder in the Negro leagues.

Death 

Suttles died of lymphoma in Newark, New Jersey, at age 65. Lenny Pearson, who played with and for Suttles, recalled in John Holway's book Blackball Stars: "He told us, 'When I die, have a little thought for my memory, but don't mourn me too much.

Suttles was interred in Glendale Cemetery in Bloomfield, New Jersey.

References

External links

 and Baseball-Reference Black Baseball stats and Seamheads
  and Seamheads
 

1901 births
1966 deaths
National Baseball Hall of Fame inductees
Birmingham Black Barons players
St. Louis Stars (baseball) players
Chicago American Giants players
Baltimore Black Sox players
Newark Eagles players
New York Black Yankees players
Baseball first basemen
Baseball players from Alabama
People from Jefferson County, Alabama
Baseball players from Newark, New Jersey
Burials in New Jersey
20th-century African-American sportspeople